Habibul Ahsan is a Bangladeshi epidemiologist.

Ahsan was born in Bangladesh. After earning his Bachelor of Medicine, Bachelor of Surgery at the University of Dhaka in 1989, Ahsan completed a master's in medical science at the University of Western Australia in 1992. He conducted postdoctoral research in molecular epidemiology at Columbia University from 1993 to 1995. In 2018, the University of Chicago appointed Ahsan to the Louis Block Distinguished Service Professorship within the Department of Public Health Sciences.

References

Year of birth missing (living people)
Living people
Bangladeshi expatriates in Australia
Bangladeshi expatriates in the United States
Bangladeshi epidemiologists
University of Dhaka alumni
University of Western Australia alumni
University of Chicago faculty
20th-century Bangladeshi physicians